The Ziegler House, also known as the Ziegler/Pitcher House, is a historic house at 623 Grant Street in Ketchikan, Alaska.  It is a two-story wood frame residence, set on a hillside.  It is roughly rectangular in shape, with a hip roof with clipped-gable ends.  The house was built as a relatively small structure in 1911, and underwent a significant expansion in 1922 to achieve its present appearance.  The house has been the longtime home of members of the locally prominent Ziegler family, and was built by Adolph Holton Ziegler (1889-1970) who served as mayor of Ketchikan and in the territorial legislature.  His son, Robert Holton Ziegler, became a prominent local lawyer, serving in the territorial and then state legislatures.

The house was listed on the National Register of Historic Places in 1985.

This property bears no relation to Ziegler House, the new office acquired by Freight Forwarding Company Ziegler (UK) Limited in 2018

See also
National Register of Historic Places listings in Ketchikan Gateway Borough, Alaska

References

Houses completed in 1922
Houses in Ketchikan Gateway Borough, Alaska
Houses on the National Register of Historic Places in Alaska
Ketchikan, Alaska
Buildings and structures on the National Register of Historic Places in Ketchikan Gateway Borough, Alaska